MLTR (also known as Greatest Hits and Strange Foreign Beauty) is the third compilation album by Danish soft rock group Michael Learns to Rock. It was released as Strange Foreign Beauty - Remixed & More in Asia on 10 May 1999 and in Denmark as MLTR on 19 May 1999 as their first compilation album there. In the United Kingdom, Strange Foreign Beauty was released as their debut release on Parlophone on 30 August 1999.

This compilation contains some of refined and remixed versions of songs from the group's first four studio albums, Michael Learns to Rock (1999), Colours (1993), Played on Pepper (1995), and Nothing to Lose (1997), as well as the new song "Strange Foreign Beauty".

Track listing

Charts

Certifications

References

1999 compilation albums
Michael Learns to Rock albums
Albums produced by Per Magnusson
Albums produced by David Kreuger
Albums produced by Cutfather